Victor Reinier Nieuwenhuijzen (born 1963) is a Dutch actor and screenwriter.

Filmography

Actor

Films
 2014 – KrisKras – tourist
 2012 – De Overloper – Floris Wolfs
 2011 – Caged – Mike
 2011 – Nova Zembla – Jacob van Heemskerck
 2008 – De brief voor de Koning – Ristridin
 2003 – The Horseless Prince – father
 1999 – Baantjer: De Cock en de wraak zonder einde – Dick Vledder
 1999 – Lef – Clerence
 1996 – Weg – Vincent
 1992 – Rerun – Felix
 1990 – Alissa in Concert – agent
 1990 – My Blue Heaven – Mickey

Television
 2007–present – Flikken Maastricht – Floris Wolfs
 2006 – Aspe – Freek Keyzer
 2005–2007 – Gooische Vrouwen – Anton van Kampen
 2004 – De Band – Sjoert
 2001 –  – Quizmaster
 1997 – Pittige tijden – Fledder
 1995–2006 – Baantjer – Dick Vledder
 1994 – Flodder – Vince Schaeffers
 1993 – Bureau Kruislaan – police officer
 1993, 1995	– Coverstory – Arno
 1992 – Oppassen!!! – Jacques de Smet
 1990,1993 – 12 steden, 13 ongelukken – Harjo
 1990–1991	– Spijkerhoek – Bas de Vries

Presenter
AVROTROS
 2014–present – De Duitsers
TROS
 2011 – De beste zangers van Nederland	
 2010 – De beste zangers van Nederland
 2010 – Timboektoe

SBS 6
 2003–2004 – De Sponsor Loterij Trap
 2003 – Klaar voor de Start

RTL 5
 2003 – Victor op Zoek

RTL 4
 2002 – Typisch '70 
 1997–2001 – Lucky Letters

Screenwriter
 2007–present – Flikken Maastricht

Director
 2012–2013 – Flikken Maastricht

External links

1963 births
Living people
Dutch male film actors
Dutch male television actors
Dutch screenwriters
Dutch male screenwriters
20th-century Dutch male actors
21st-century Dutch male actors
Male actors from Amsterdam
21st-century screenwriters
21st-century Dutch male writers